USS Robalo (SS-273), a Gato-class submarine, was the only ship of the United States Navy to be named for the róbalo or common snook.

Construction and commissioning
Robalo′s keel was laid down on 24 October 1942 by the Manitowoc Shipbuilding Company at [Manitowoc, Wisconsin. She was launched on 9 May 1943, sponsored by Mrs. E. S. Root, and commissioned on 28 September 1943.

First patrol
After passage by inland waterways and being floated down the Mississippi River, Robalo deployed to the Pacific. On her first war patrol (under the leadership of Commander Stephen Ambruster, Annapolis class of 1928), she sortied from Pearl Harbor, hunting Japanese ships west of the Philippines. On 12 February 1944, Armbruster reported seeing a large, two-masted sailboat. She spent 36 of her 57-day mission submerged. When she arrived, her commanding officer was summarily relieved by Admiral Christie and replaced with Manning Kimmel (class of 1935).

In March 1944, Christie (based on Ultra intelligence) feared surprise from a strong Japanese force. No attack ever materialized.

Second patrol
For her second patrol, Robalo went to the South China Sea, assigned to interdict Japanese tanker traffic from French Indochina to the fleet anchorage at Tawi Tawi. On 24 April 1944 off Indochina, she was bombed by a Japanese antisubmarine aircraft, suffering shattered and flooded periscopes and loss of radar, while taking a harrowing plunge to  after her main induction valve was improperly closed (a casualty frighteningly reminiscent of Squalus) in diving to escape. Robalo had been seen by Japanese aircraft carrier Kaiyō while escorting convoy Hi-58, which resulted in Robalo being damaged 24 April 1944. One of the ships that escaped damage from Robalo was the Mayasan Maru. On a "wildly aggressive patrol" lasting 51 days, Robalo fired 20 torpedoes in four attacks. In regard to the four claims by Robalo, on May 3, 1944, six torpedoes against a 4000-ton freighter (no damage); May 8, 1944, four torpedoes against a 1900-ton submarine (no damage); May 17, 1944, six torpedoes against a 7500-ton tanker (one hit) and four torpedoes against a 1500-ton destroyer (no damage). She was credited with sinking a 7500-ton tanker, which was not confirmed postwar by JANAC. When she returned to Fremantle, Captain "Tex" McLean (commanding Subron 16) and Admiral Christie both considered relieving Robalos skipper for his own safety.

Third patrol
Robalo departed Fremantle on 22 June 1944 on her third war patrol. She set a course for the South China Sea to conduct her patrol in the vicinity of the Natuna Islands. After transiting Makassar Strait and Balabac Strait (which was well-known to be mined), she was scheduled to arrive on station about 6 July and remain until dark on 2 August 1944. On 2 July, a contact report stated Robalo had sighted a Fusō-class battleship, with air cover and two destroyers for escort, just east of Borneo. No other messages were ever received from the submarine, and when she did not return from patrol, she was presumed lost.

Robalo was stricken from the Naval Vessel Register on 16 September 1944.

Honors and awards
Robalo earned two battle stars for World War II service.

Fate of survivors
On 2 August, a note was handed from the cell window of the Kempei Tai military prison on Palawan Island in the Philippines, to Ed Petry, an American POW from the Puerto Princesa Prison Camp who was passing by. The note was, in turn, given to Hubert D. Hough, Yeoman Second Class, who was also a prisoner at the camp. He contacted Trinidad Mendoza (Red Hankie), wife of guerrilla leader Dr. Mendoza, who had the Coastwatchers radio General MacArthur and Admiral Ralph Christie in Australia.

Four men swam ashore and made their way through the jungles to a small barrier northwest of the Puerto Princesa Prison Camp, where Japanese Military Police captured them and jailed them for guerrilla activities. On 15 August, they were evacuated by a Japanese destroyer and never heard from again. The exact fate of the survivors is unknown.

Though Admiral Christie knew better, for morale reasons, all hands were reported as having gone down with the boat, but other prisoners on Palawan reported that the boat's skipper, Lieutenant Commander Manning Kimmel, son of Admiral Husband Kimmel, was one of the survivors. After an air strike on Palawan, the Japanese were so angered that they pushed Kimmel and the other prisoners into a ditch, poured in gasoline, and burned them alive. This incident was reported by Clay Blair Jr., a submarine veteran of the war and author of the definitive work Silent Victory: The US Submarine War Against Japan (see Volume 2, pp660–662 for details).

Discovery
Her identity was confirmed by the U. S. Navy.

References

External links
 America's Fresh Water Submarines
 The Memorial to USS Robalo at Lindenwood Park in Fargo, North Dakota
 Fresh Water Submarines: The Manitowoc Story by Rear Admiral William T. Nelson, USN (Ret.)
 The Wisconsin Maritime Museum in Manitowoc
 A History of the Manitowoc Shipbuilding Company
 On Eternal Patrol: USS Robalo
 Dive Detectives Dive Detectives TV series looks for the Flier and Robalo (https://web.archive.org/web/20110706182535/http://www.history.ca/ontv/titledetails.aspx?titleid=152495).

 

Gato-class submarines
World War II submarines of the United States
Lost submarines of the United States
World War II shipwrecks in the South China Sea
1943 ships
Maritime incidents in July 1944
Ships lost with all hands
Ships built in Manitowoc, Wisconsin